The 1913 Tulane Olive and Blue football team was an American football team that represented Tulane University as a member of the Southern Intercollegiate Athletic Association (SIAA) during the 1913 college football season. In its first year under head coach A. C. Hoffman, Tulane compiled a 3–5 record.

Schedule

References

Tulane
Tulane Green Wave football seasons
Tulane Olive and Blue football